The Trade Union of Railwaymen and Transport Construction Workers of Ukraine (TURU) is national trade union federation bringing together unions representing workers in the railway industry in Ukraine.

The federation was established on 23 January 1992, and by the end of the century, it had about 760,000 members.  As of 2015, it had 478,699 members.  By 2019, its affiliates consisted of eight trade unions, of which, four were also affiliated to the Federation of Trade Unions of Ukraine.

References

External links

Railway labor unions
Trade unions established in 1992
Trade unions in Ukraine